Wildfire is a steel roller coaster located at Silver Dollar City in Branson, Missouri. The $14 million ride was built by Swiss manufacturer Bolliger & Mabillard and opened to the public on April 4, 2001. Wildfire is themed as a flying machine developed by an 1880s Ozark inventor.

Along its  of track, Wildfire features five inversions including an Immelmann loop, a vertical loop, a cobra roll and a corkscrew.

History
In 2000, Silver Dollar City announced that they would be adding the Wildfire roller coaster to their park in April 2001. At a cost of $14 million, the ride would be the most expensive attraction in the park's history. At the time of the announcement, construction was already underway on an undeveloped portion of land in the outskirts of the park. All of the ride's footings were in place with some of the steel supports already erected. Construction was expected to be completed in early January the following year, leaving three months for testing, landscaping and theming. On April 4, 2001, Wildfire officially opened to the public.

Characteristics

The  Wildfire features five inversions including an Immelmann loop, a vertical loop, a cobra roll and a corkscrew. The track was manufactured by Clermont Steel Fabricators located in Batavia, Ohio. Wildfire operates with two trains (generally with one train loading/unloading while the other runs the course, each featuring eight cars. Each car seats riders four abreast with ratcheting over-the-shoulder restraints. This configuration allows the ride to achieve a theoretical hourly capacity of 1,300 riders per hour.

Wildfire is located in the "Hugo's Hill Street" district of Silver Dollar City. It is themed around the story of an 1880s Ozark inventor named Dr. Horatio Harris. Harris had an aim to create a powered flying contraption for flight across the Ozark Mountains. The ride's name refers to the fuel he developed for his flying machine. The ride's queue and station area are modelled as the laboratory and invention warehouse of Harris. Riders eventually board his Wildfire-powered flying machine, the steel roller coaster. One year after the opening of the roller coaster Silver Dollar City began selling the Wildfire Burger, a hot and spicy hamburger, themed after the ride.

Ride experience
This is followed by an Immelmann loop, a vertical loop and a cobra roll, the latter of which inverts riders twice. Then the train heads up a banked curve into a corkscrew and a 230 degree turn into the final brake run.

Reception
Rick Baker, Silver Dollar City's vice president of corporate development and design, expected the addition of the ride would increase season pass sales by 9% to 250,000. In 2001, the park was visited by a total of 2.1 million people.

In Amusement Today's annual Golden Ticket Awards, Wildfire ranked in the top 50 steel roller coasters three times. In 2003 it debuted at position 40, before dropping to 46 in 2004 and 49 in 2005.  it has not returned to the listing.

In Mitch Hawker's worldwide Best Roller Coaster Poll, Wildfire entered at position 47 in 2001, before peaking at 45 in 2005. It hovered in positions around 60 before dropping to 96 in 2012. The ride's ranking in the poll is shown in the table below.

Notes

References

External links
 
 
 

Roller coasters in Missouri
Roller coasters introduced in 2001
Buildings and structures in Taney County, Missouri
Silver Dollar City
Roller coasters operated by Herschend Family Entertainment